Black Dream is the debut solo album by Chinese artist Dou Wei, released in October 1994 on Magic Stone Records. It is considered to be a landmark album among the Chinese rock scene.

Drawing heavily from goth rock acts such as Bauhaus and The Cure, as well as dub and reggae, Black Dream stood in direct contrast to the traditional guitar-oriented styles which had defined Chinese rock up to that point. The album's haunting production, coupled with Dou's stream-of-conscious vocal delivery, established it as China's first alternative album.

The album has been ranked among Taiwan's best 1990s pop albums.

Background 
After leaving seminal Chinese hard rock band Black Panther in October 1991. Dou immediately established the band Dreaming. Many of the tracks on Black Dream were written during this period. Dreaming released one song, "希望之光" ("Light of Hope") before disbanding in October 1992.

Track listing

Personnel 
Personnel as listed in the album's liner notes are:

Musicians 

 Dou Wei - vocals, guitar, drums
 Cao Jun - guitar
 Hu Xiaohai - bass
 Zhao Muyang - drums
 Bai Fanglin - keyboards
 Liu Xiaosong - percussion (track 9)

Production 

 Zhang Peiren - executive producer
 Jia Minshu - producer, recording
 Jin Shaogang - recording
 Yan Zhongkun - mixing; mastering
 Xu Chongxian - mastering

References

External links 

1994 debut albums
Dou Wei albums